Manuel Cervantes García (born 6 April 1957) is a Spanish former professional footballer who played as a goalkeeper.

He is the father of professional tennis player Íñigo Cervantes Huegun.

Career
Born in Irun, Cervantes played for Real Sociedad, Real Murcia, Real Betis and Salamanca.

References

1957 births
Living people
Spanish footballers
Association football goalkeepers
Sportspeople from Irun
Real Sociedad footballers
Real Murcia players
Real Betis players
UD Salamanca players
La Liga players